"Everything I Wanted" (stylized in all lowercase) is a song by American singer and songwriter Billie Eilish, and co-written by Eilish and her brother Finneas O'Connell, who also produced it. Darkroom and Interscope Records released the track as a standalone single on November 13, 2019, and later added it to the deluxe edition of Eilish's debut studio album When We All Fall Asleep, Where Do We Go? (2019) in December that year. It is a house and electronica-influenced pop and alternative pop track with minimal piano and downtempo bass guitar instrumentation. Inspired by a nightmare she experienced, the song is about Eilish's strong relationship with O'Connell and his protectiveness of her from harm.

"Everything I Wanted" received acclaim from critics, several of whom praised the music and lyrics. The song reached number eight on the US Billboard Hot 100, becoming Eilish's second top-ten hit in the United States. It debuted at number one in the record charts of several countries, including Ireland and Norway, and peaked at number three on the UK Singles Chart. "Everything I Wanted" has received several certifications, including quadruple platinum in Canada. On November 24, 2020, the song received nominations for Song of the Year, and Best Pop Solo Performance at the 63rd Annual Grammy Awards, making it Eilish's second consecutive year for earning a nomination in such categories, with it winning Record of the Year.

Eilish directed the song's accompanying music video, which was uploaded to her YouTube channel on January 23, 2020. The video depicts Eilish and Finneas holding hands while driving in a Dodge Challenger through a city and into the ocean; it received positive reviews from critics, many of whom praised its visual theme and message. Eilish has performed "Everything I Wanted" live several times; it was included on the setlist of her When We All Fall Asleep Tour (2019) and Where Do We Go? World Tour (2020). Eilish and Finneas performed the track during a 50-minute livestream for Verizon Communications in April 2020, as well as at the 63rd Grammy Awards in March 2021.

Background and release
In October 2019, Finneas O'Connell said he and his sister Billie Eilish were working on new music. In November of that year, Eilish announced the release of two new songs and a music video for the song "Xanny", which was released the following month. Eilish later announced the song's title "Everything I Wanted" and its release date during a livestream on Instagram on November 10, 2019. "Everything I Wanted" was used in an advertisement for Beats by Dre headphones that features Eilish. The track was originally titled "Nightmare".

Eilish and O'Connell—who is best known by his stage name Finneas—started to write "Everything I Wanted" in September 2018; it began as a feeling of Eilish's depression. Eilish got the inspiration for the song in 2018, when she had a dream in which she died after jumping off the Golden Gate Bridge and nobody cared. Eilish couldn't stop thinking about her nightmares, which made her feel "caught up" and "distracted" as she and O'Connell were trying to work her fears into a new track. When she told O'Connell about the idea, he became very uncomfortable about the topic. In an interview with The New York Times, Eilish said she "was in a really bad place mentally" while O'Connell said he did not want to help her write a hopeless song about suicide because he and their parents were concerned about her well-being. He told Eilish she "can't always solve [her] problems in a song". Eilish persuaded O'Connell and their parents by telling them writing "Everything I Wanted" was "the way I can feel those things without doing something to myself". Eilish and O'Connell changed the song's subject to one of mutual support and togetherness rather than depression and suicide. The duo discussed how their relationship and understanding of what music is have made them write music together. The song also references Eilish's feelings about fame, which she sometimes finds frustrating.

"Everything I Wanted" was mastered by John Greenham and mixed by Rob Kinelski, both of whom also served as studio personnel. The song was released for digital download and streaming as a single on November 13, 2019, via Darkroom and Interscope Records. It was added to the reissue of Eilish's debut studio album When We All Fall Asleep, Where Do We Go? in December 2019. A flexi disc of the song was released via pre-order to ship in the following four-to-six weeks. The release came with a digital single that was delivered to US customers via email. The single's cover art, an abstract painting of the Golden Gate Bridge in San Francisco, California, was made by Jason Anderson.

Composition
"Everything I Wanted" has a moderately fast tempo of 120 beats per minute (BPM) and is played in the key of A major while Eilish's vocal range spans from the low note of E3 to the high note of B4. According to Jem Aswad from Variety, the song features a significant use of reverberation, a "gentle beatbox, and soft, hazy keyboard riffs". The track has been described as a house and electronica-influenced pop and alternative pop track in press reviews; it features minimalist production consisting of piano and downtempo bass guitar instrumentation. According to Lake Schatz of Consequence of Sound, the song has a "spare beat and quiet keys".

According to Eilish, the song discusses her relationship with O'Connell and his ongoing support for her. The song's first verse was inspired by Eilish's experiences with depression and mental illness. The track begins with the singer talking about her committing suicide and nobody caring; "Thought I could fly / So I stepped off the Golden / Nobody cried / Nobody even noticed / I saw them standing right there / Kinda thought they might care". In the chorus, Eilish and O'Connell talk about their mutual support for each other and the way O'Connell helps Eilish deal with fame and her personal demons. "And you say, 'As long as I'm here, no one can hurt you' / Don't wanna lie here, but you can learn to / If I could change the way that you see yourself / You wouldn't wonder why you hear, 'they don't deserve you'". Pitchforks Dani Blum stated the song "has layered vocals that swell and surround Eilish in the bridge" as she repeatedly asks; "If I knew it all then, would I do it again? / If they knew what they said would go straight to my head / What would they say instead?".

Critical response
"Everything I Wanted" received critical acclaim. The song was praised by Insider Callie Ahlgrim, who called it a "thoughtful dynamic" and the lyrics a "breathtaking portrait of their in-sync collaborative skills". Jon Caramanica from The New York Times said the keyboards on the recording are "urgent" and "elegiac", and described the chorus as "draining yet hopeful". Rolling Stone’s Brenna Ehrlich stated the song showed a "softer, sadder version of Eilish" and described the track as "a meditation on fame". Writing for Clash, Robin Murray said the song "is definitely hewn from Billie's tender side". The staff of DIY labeled the track a "cool, quietly upbeat production". Billboard Heran Mamo called the track a "touching tribute". Idolator's Mike Wass said the song was "eerie, yet comforting". Starr Bowenbank writing for Cosmopolitan magazine regarded it as a song that would "leave you sobbing in a puddle of your own tears". ABC News Radio's Randy Holmes described "Everything I Wanted" as an "emotional" and "chilling" track. Julia Emmanuele of Bustle magazine viewed the song "makes it clear that Eilish's experiences with managing her mental health is constantly evolving, but it seems that the singer is determined to surround herself with people like Finneas, who help support her through it all."

Jasmine Gomez, writing for Seventeen, called "Everything I Wanted" a "haunting, yet beautiful tribute" from Eilish to Finneas. Rhian Daly of NME wrote the track's "message is cohesive and clear. The duo have got each other's backs, be that protecting each other from the outside world and helping change their perceptions of themselves." Brent Furdyk, writing for Entertainment Tonight Canada, labeled the song "a touching tribute to [Eilish's and O'Connell's] kindship” In a mixed review for Los Angeles Times, August Brown called the song a "misty, echoing loop that keeps her downcast voice front and center in the mix". The staff of Electronic Beats compared the track to Eilish's number-one hit "Bad Guy" while Jem Aswad of Variety said it is "neither a menacing banger like ["Bad Guy"] or a ballad like "I Love You". Sam Prance of PopBuzz labeled the song's lyrics as "heartbreakingly personal". Allie Gemmill of Teen Vogue described "Everything I Wanted" as "moody", "slow", and "introspective", saying it is another "classic Billie jam". In a review for Stereogum, Chris Deville said the track puts a "crystalline, watery spin on her signature sound".

Accolades

Commercial performance
"Everything I Wanted" debuted at number 74 on the US Billboard Hot 100 on November 23, 2019, before rising to its peak of number eight on the chart the following week, earning Eilish her second top-ten hit in the United States. The song also achieved success on Billboard component charts; it topped the Billboard Alternative Songs radio airplay chart in February 2020, becoming her third number one on the chart, tying Eilish with Beck and Alanis Morissette for the most number ones by a solo artist on the Alternative Songs chart. "Everything I Wanted" also reached the top five on the Adult Top 40, Dance/Mix Show Airplay, Mainstream Top 40 and Hot Rock & Alternative Songs charts. It has received a triple platinum certification by the Recording Industry Association of America (RIAA), denoting track-equivalent sales of three million units based on sales and streams.

Internationally, "Everything I Wanted" peaked at number eight on the Canadian Hot 100 and has received a quadruple platinum certification by Music Canada (MC). In the United Kingdom, the song reached a peak of number three on the UK Singles Chart, becoming Eilish's third top-ten hit in the United Kingdom. It has received a double platinum certification from the British Phonographic Industry (BPI), which denotes track-equivalent sales of 1,200,000 units. The track peaked at number two on the Australian singles chart and has also received a quintuple-platinum certification by the Australian Recording Industry Association (ARIA). "Everything I Wanted" peaked atop the charts in Estonia, Ireland, Latvia, Lithuania, and Norway, while achieving top 10 peaks in Austria, Belgium, and Germany.

Music video

Background and release
Eilish released the music video for "Everything I Wanted" on January 23, 2020, and announced its premiere the same day on Instagram in a post captioned; "something is coming". The video was directed by Eilish, who stated; "My brother and I wrote this song about each other and I wanted to create a visual that emphasizes that no matter what, we’ll be there for each other through everything. This is the second video I’ve directed of mine. We worked so hard, for hours and hours on end." Eilish wanted the video to showcase the relationship between her and her brother. Eilish stated during an interview with BBC Radio 1's Annie Mac; "Pretty much that whole song is about me and Finneas' relationship as siblings. In the dream, the fans didn't care. The internet shit on me for killing myself, all this stuff, and it really did mess me up."

Synopsis

The video begins with the text; "Finneas is my brother and my best friend. no matter the circumstance, we always have and always will be there for each other". Eilish is driving a car with Finneas O'Connell as a front-seat passenger; they stare ahead blankly and their bodies are expressionless. The siblings drive through a dreamscape in which many scenes are reminiscent of places in California. Eilish sings about dreaming she had jumped off San Francisco's Golden Gate Bridge and was ignored by her loved ones and fans as depicted in the song's lyrics. O'Connell looks out of the windows as they drive through a tunnel and out of the city; they travel through a desert and past a valley, and continue through Long Beach, California, where they drive into the ocean. The car is swept away by the sea and slowly sinks and starts to fill with water. Eilish and O'Connell stare blankly as the car continues to sink. O'Connell extends his hand and Eilish grabs it as they look at each other and smile. The car's headlights flicker and switch off. The video ends with the siblings still holding hands as the car continues to sink and flood.

Reception
The music video was positively received by critics. Rebecca Alter of Vulture called the video "very good" and commented it "looks like it was shot by the cinematographer who did 'The Long Night' on Game of Thrones". MTV's Jordyn Tilchen praised Eilish for directing the video and said her "skills shine through on this project". Layla Halabian of Nylon wrote: "the video [brings] new meaning to the saying: Blood is thicker than water." Derrick Rossignol of Uproxx called the visual a "shadowy, Eilish-directed clip" while Alyssa Quiles of Alternative Press called it "stunning". In his review for Complex, Joshua Espinoza said Eilish's message to her brother is "heartfelt". Michele Mendez of Elite Daily  likened the video's story and concept of the siblings' relationship, saying, "they've got a video dedicated to their unbreakable bond". Writing for The Fader, Jordan Darville compared the video's production to that of English musician James Blake. Jarrod Johnson II of Paste magazine labeled the video as appropriately foreboding.

Live performances and other usages
Eilish performed "Everything I Wanted" live for the first time in December 2019 in Mexico City on the final stop of her When We All Fall Asleep Tour, and during an Apple Live acoustic show at the Steve Jobs Theater in Cupertino the same year. "Everything I Wanted" was included on her setlist for the Where Do We Go? World Tour (2020). Eilish performed the song live with O'Connell playing acoustic guitar for Blux in February 2020. In April of that year, the pair performed an acoustic version of "Everything I Wanted" during a 50-minute livestream for Verizon Communications. On February 7, 2020, Alicia Keys covered "Everything I Wanted" for BBC Radio 1's Live Lounge segment. On March 9, 2020, JP Cooper and his band covered the song for Billboard; they slowly built "a lush unfurling arrangement  dual guitars, piano and organ", and that Cooper was crooning "as he gently strums an electric guitar". Cooper told Billboard he does not perform many covers but he felt drawn to the song, and that he and his band had a great time recording it. On March 13, 2020, Georgia recorded a cover of "Everything I Wanted" at Abbey Road Studios in London. Sam Moore of NME wrote that the cover had mixed together "elements of electro-pop and orchestral music". On March 13, 2020, English indie rock band Gengahr performed a cover of the song for Triple J's Like a Version segment. The band additionally performed their track "Heavenly Maybe". Gengahr's rendition of "Everything I Wanted" was later released as a single.

Credits and personnel
Credits adapted from Tidal.

 Billie Eilish – vocals, songwriter
 Finneas O'Connell – producer, songwriter, engineer, backing vocals, drum programmer, bass, piano, synthesizer
 John Greenham – mastering engineer
 Rob Kinelski – mixer

Charts

Weekly charts

Year-end charts

Certifications

Release history

Footnotes

References

2019 singles
2019 songs
Billie Eilish songs
Interscope Records singles
Irish Singles Chart number-one singles
Number-one singles in Norway
Song recordings produced by Finneas O'Connell
Songs written by Billie Eilish
Songs written by Finneas O'Connell
Songs about nightmares
Songs about suicide
Grammy Award for Record of the Year